HMS Musquito (or Mosquito) was a 12-gun schooner, previously a French privateer. The Royal Navy captured her in 1799.  having just been lost to capture, the navy took their capture into service as Musquito. During her brief service on the Jamaica station Musquito captured several merchantmen and a small armed vessel. The Navy sold her in 1802.

Capture
The Royal Navy captured a privateer, possibly Hunter, in the West Indies in 1799.

Career
At some point in May 1799, Musquito and  captured a Spanish schooner from Port au Plat that was carrying dollars.

In second-half of 1799, Musquito captured the French schooner Byoneuse, which was sailing from Jérémie to Saint Jago de Cuba with a cargo of coffee and household furniture.

During the same period Musquito also captured the French schooner Floretta, of two guns and a crew of ten men. Floretta, of 28 tons (bm), had been sailing from Barracoa to Cape François with a cargo of flour.

In early 1800 Musquito recaptured the American schooner Experiment, which was carrying rum and sugar.

The Naval Chronicle listed the commander of the Musquito schooner in late 1801 or early 1800 as Lieutenant J. Bennett.

On 10 August Lowestoffe grounded, as did five merchantmen. In the late afternoon of 11 August Acasta left Bonetta and three of her own boats to help the wrecked vessels and then took command of the convoy.

Fate
The navy sold Musquito at Jamaica on 25 August 1802 for £750.

Notes, citations and references
Notes

Citations

References
 
  

Captured ships
Privateer ships of France
Schooners of the Royal Navy
1790s ships